Pieter Boelmans ter Spill  ( – ) was a Dutch male footballer.

Club career
Boelmans ter Spill was a big center-forward who played for HFC.

International career
He was part of the Netherlands national football team, playing 3 matches. He played his first match on 1 April 1907 against England.

See also
 List of Dutch international footballers

References

External links

1886 births
1954 deaths
Sportspeople from Alkmaar
Association football forwards
Dutch footballers
Netherlands international footballers
Footballers from North Holland